The MLS Newcomer of the Year Award is awarded by Major League Soccer to a player who has professional experience in another league and has an outstanding season in his first season of play in MLS.

Winners

Newcomer of the Year